Eckbo is a surname. Notable people with the surname include:

B. Espen Eckbo (born 1952), American economist
Eivind Eckbo (1927–2017), Norwegian politician, lawyer and farmer
Espen Eckbo (born 1973), Norwegian actor, writer and comedian
Garrett Eckbo (1910–2000), American landscape architect

See also 
Eckbo, Dean, Austin and Williams (EDAW), international landscape architecture, urban and environmental design firm